Ingrid Dupre Tarrant (born 15 October 1954) is an English television personality and former wife of Chris Tarrant. She has appeared on such programmes as TV Mail, Wish You Were Here? and This Morning. She has also appeared on a special version of What Not to Wear where she received a makeover from fashion advisors Trinny and Susannah.

She had two children with her first husband, Tony Walsh; Dexter and Fia, and two with her second husband Chris Tarrant; Sammy and Toby. After her marriage collapsed in 2006, she received much media attention, and she has since gone on to appear in a number of British reality television programmes which include The Race, The Verdict, Deadline and Celebrity Coach Trip partnered with friend Carol Harrison.

Tarrant appears regularly on GB News on shows such as Neil Oliver Live, and most notably Mark Dolan Tonight on a weekly basis.

See also
Capital Radio

References

External links 

1954 births
Living people
British television presenters
People educated at St Margaret's School, Bushey
People from Elstree